Gauteng and Environs Library Consortium (GAELIC) was the first project of FOTIM (Foundation of Tertiary Institutions of the Northern Metropolis) in South Africa.  GAELIC was founded in April 1996. Its mission was to use and develop the information resources in the Gauteng, Limpopo, and North West province of South Africa in order to promote education, research and lifelong learning. Due to consolidation of projects and duplication, FOTIM and GAELIC closed down in July 2011.

External links
http://uir.unisa.ac.za/bitstream/handle/10500/6048/GAELIC%20inventory.pdf

1996 establishments in South Africa
Educational organisations based in South Africa
Library consortia